The 2020–21 Syracuse Orange women's basketball team represented Syracuse University during the 2020–21 NCAA Division I women's basketball season. The Orange were led by fifteenth year head coach Quentin Hillsman. The Orange were eighth year members of the Atlantic Coast Conference and played their home games at the Carrier Dome in Syracuse, New York.

The Orange finished the season 15–9 and 9–7 in ACC play to finish in a tie for fourth place.  As the fifth seed in the ACC tournament, they defeated to Boston College in the Second Round and Florida State in the Quarterfinals before losing to Louisville in the Semifinals.  They received an at-large bid to the NCAA tournament where they were the eight seed in the Riverwalk Regional.  In the tournament they defeated nine seed South Dakota State in the First Round before losing to one seed UConn to end their season.

Previous season
For the 2019–20 season, the Orange finished 16–15 and 9–9 in ACC play to finish in eighth place.  As the eighth seed in the ACC tournament, they defeated Virginia in the Second Round before losing to Louisville in Quarterfinals.  The NCAA tournament and WNIT were cancelled due to the COVID-19 outbreak.

Off-season

Departures

Recruiting Class

Source:

Roster

Schedule

Source:

|-
!colspan=6 style="background:#D44500; color:#212B6D;"| Regular Season

|-
!colspan=6 style="background:#D44500; color:#212B6D;"| ACC Women's Tournament

|-
!colspan=6 style=";"| NCAA tournament

Rankings

The Coaches Poll releases a final poll after the NCAA tournament, but the AP Poll does not release a poll at this time.

See also
 2020–21 Syracuse Orange men's basketball team

References

Syracuse Orange women's basketball seasons
Syracuse
Syracuse basketball, women
Syracuse basketball, women
Syracuse